Ichic Challhua or Ichik Challwa (Ancash Quechua ichik small, Quechua challwa fish, "little fish", also spelled Ichic Challhua) is a mountain in the Andes of Peru which reaches a height of approximately . It is located in the Ancash Region, Huari Province, San Marcos District.

References 

Mountains of Peru
Mountains of Ancash Region